Black Sword is a 1985 role-playing game adventure for Stormbringer published by Chaosium.

Plot summary
Black Sword is the second adventure about the heroine Freyda Nikorn's search for Elric of Melniboné, who killed her father.

Reception
Phil Frances reviewed Black Sword for White Dwarf #79, and stated that "This may prove to be the most fascinating Stormbringer adventure you've played yet."

Michael R. Jarrell reviewed Black Sword in Space Gamer/Fantasy Gamer No. 82. Jarrell commented that "in conclusion, I have to give Black Sword a thumbs up. An exceptional adventure and one that will provide more than one night's play."

Reviews
Different Worlds #45 (March/April, 1987)

References

Fantasy role-playing game adventures
Role-playing game supplements introduced in 1985